Andy & Kouros (Persian: اندی و کورس) were an Iranian pop duo formed together in 1985, composed of Andranik "Andy" Madadian and Kouros Shahmiri.

Andy and Kouros released four albums: Khastegary (1985), Parvaz (1987), the hugely successful Balla (1990), and finally Goodbye (1991). Throughout their career, they often performed along with various other artists, such as Shahram Shabpareh, Shohreh Solati, Dariush Eghbali, Siavash Shams, Jaklin Viguen (the daughter of Viguen) and Toofan.

Andy and Kouros split in 1991. To commemorate their contributions to Persian pop, a documentary was released focusing on their career which featured interviews with various Persian celebrities and singers to give their opinion on the duo, such as Shohreh Aghdashloo (who would later co-star with Andy in House of Sand and Fog), Aref Arefkia, Manoochehr, Shahram Shabpareh (who claimed that he saw the duo as little brothers), Leila Forouhar, Bijan Mortazavi, Hassan Shamaizadeh and Siavash Shams. Fans of the duo were also interviewed to express their opinions on the group splitting. In an interview, Andy and Kouros themselves claimed that their split was due to work, and gave their thanks to their fans for their support.

Following their split, Andy and Kouros each went on to have successful solo careers, though they reunited occasionally, such as Andy singing along with Kouros in one song in the latter's Gates of Love album. In 2002 and 2004, they performed together for a sold-out audience in San Jose, California; in 2009, they went on an international tour together in the Iranian diaspora; and performed together again in May 2010. They also appeared together in a music video by Farez remaking their hit song "Niloufar".

Discography

Albums

Iranian musical duos
Caltex Records artists
Taraneh Records artists